Alexandra Elena Mozarowski Ruiz de Frías (17 October 1958 – 14 September 1977), known by the stage name Sandra Mozarowsky, was a Spanish actress. Her acting career spanned from 1969 until her death in 1977. She starred in films such as Night of the Seagulls and Beatriz.

Early life and career
Alexandra Elena Mozarowski Ruiz de Frías (her real name) was born in Tangier, Morocco, on 17 October, 1958. She was the daughter of a Russian father and Spanish mother. Until her death in 1977, Sandra was one of the "Lolitas" of the coproduced Spanish Genre and "exploitation" cinema of the late seventies. Sandra's film credits include La noche de las gaviotas - the fourth and final film in the Blind Dead series, El colegio de la muerte (School of Death), Cuando el cuerno suena (When the Horn Sounds), Beatriz, and Call Girl: La vida privada de una señorita (Call Girl: The Private Life of a Lady Well).

Death
Sandra Mozarowsky fell off her fourth-floor balcony, spent twenty-two days in vegetative coma, and finally succumbed to her injuries on 14 September, 1977. Her death was officially ruled to be suicide, but some news reports stated she was watering flowers at the time of her fall, which took place around 4 a.m.

Mozarowsky's death was featured in the September 1977 issue of a tabloid called Garbo, wherein personal friend Inma de Santis said that her death was not simply a consequence of her obsession to be thin—she did want to lose weight—but she didn't think that Mazarowsky was fat, "because the type of films being made in this country requires you to do these things." De Santis blamed the profession for this. All Mozarowsky ate in a day, she alleged, was a banana with a cup of tea. She also took pills to kill her appetite and other pills for her mood.

Theories and speculations have surrounded her death, partly due to her acquaintances' adamant unwillingness to accept the suicide verdict and the overall lack of consensus on the circumstances of her fall. Some of these theories are centered on a rumored affair with King Juan Carlos I, followed by a pregnancy, her refusal to terminate it, and the subsequent intervention of third parties linked to secret service operatives and/or Royal House security staff.  Her surprising opposition to abortion was documented in an interview that was published after her passing, even though the topic wasn't central to the conversation. 

Speculations on her personal predicament and the controversy surrounding the cause of her death became especially frequent with the advent of the Internet; they all coalesced in a consistent version which has found its way into written media, some of it by well-established authors. For instance, in his book Ladies of Spain, Andrew Morton says:
Entre otras supuestas amantes reales se habló de la cantante italiana Raffaella Carrà y la jovencísima actriz Sandra Mozarowski, que falleció en misteriosas circunstancias. Hubo siniestras insinuaciones de que su aparente suicidio -- lo único que se sabe a ciencia cierta es que se cayó del balcón de su apartamento mientras regaba las plantas -- fue obra de personas que temían que la joven pudiera poner en un aprieto a la casa real ("Alleged royal lovers include Italian singer Raffaella Carrà and nubile actress Sandra Mozarowski, who died in mysterious circumstances. There were sinister suggestions about her apparent suicide—all that is known for a fact is that she was watering her plants when she fell off her apartment balcony—was orchestrated by [undisclosed] persons who feared she might put the Royal House in a difficult position").

In his book "Mario Conde, La reclusión del éxito", journalist Javier Bleda wrote the following (boldface not included in the original):

 Si estas declaraciones carcelarias de Julián Sancristóbal fueran ciertas, lo que no dudo en ningún momento atendiendo a que, por razón de su cargo, tenía acceso a información sensible, nos encontraríamos que, además de que Bárbara pudo haberse auto filmado, para garantizar que no sería suicidada desde un balcón (Sandra, no te olvidamos), habría otros intereses directamente relacionados con el Sistema que estarían detrás de otras igualmente magnas producciones cinematográficas.  ("If these prison depositions [concerning a video allegedly kept by Narcís Serra to keep the King in check] by Julián Sancristóbal were true, which I for one do not doubt considering [Serra's] access to sensitive intel, the logical conclusion would be that, aside from the fact Bárbara Rey might have filmed herself [with the King] in order to ensure she was not suicided from a balcony (Sandra, thou shalt not be forgotten), there would have been additional interests directly linked to the System underlying other equally egregious motion pictures").

Another explanation of the events from an unofficial point of view is offered in Escrito en un libro, authored under pen name Tom Farrell—shared by Kevin Costner's character in No Way Out, ostensibly a nod to the circumstances surrounding the death of Sean Young's character in that film. According to this book the assault on an actress, called "Sara Wagnerowski" and pregnant with the King's child (Juan Carlos and his family do appear with their names intact), was orchestrated by one "Néstor Colomer, Barón de Andújar" (arguably a fictionalized version of Nicolás Cotoner, Marquess of Mondéjar, chief of the Royal House at the time). 

According to this version, "Andújar" arranged the ambush with the intent of causing the actress a miscarriage but the injuries sustained in her defenestration were too serious. The story draws heavily from what seems to be a first-hand account of a rookie Royal House security staff member. This confidante allegedly stood near the woman's street level doorstep and witnessed her fall minutes after his immediate supervisor accompanied two other men (speculated to be Marseillais or South European thugs on a shady payroll) upstairs to her flat.

She was buried in the Holy Guardian Angel Cemetery Madrid.

Filmography

Film

Television

See also
List of unsolved deaths

References

External links
 
 Sandra Mozarowsky at Film.com
 Sandra Mozarowsky at MSN

1958 births
1977 deaths
20th-century Spanish actresses
Spanish film actresses
Spanish television actresses
Spanish people of Russian descent
Spanish child actresses
People from Tangier
Unsolved deaths